Naval War is a card game first published by Battleline Publications in 1979.

Description
Naval War is a light system of naval combat, not intended to represent any actual tactics of historical naval battles, in which players may operate ships from opposing navies side-by-side.  All ships depicted in the game were involved in World War II. The basic mechanic is one where ships have different size guns and players have cards which are different size ammunition.  A player must match ammo to the guns to fire and damage other players' ships.  Players have multiple ships and the winner is the last player with ships afloat; in the latest edition (1983), winning is based on points from sinking enemy ships.

Publication history
Naval War was first published by Battleline Publications in 1979, and was designed by S. Craig Taylor, Jr. and Neil Zimmerer.

Reception
John Scott Tynes commented: "There hasn't been an edition of Naval War since Avalon Hill's in 1983 and the game is long out of print. Yet the World Boardgaming Championships have crowned a Naval War champion every single year since 1992, a testament to the vitality and irresistible appeal of this superb game."

References

Battleline Publications games
Dedicated deck card games